Beta Microscopii (Beta Mic), Latinized from β Microscopii, is a solitary star in the constellation Microscopium. At that distance, the visual magnitude is diminished by an extinction factor of 0.19 due to interstellar dust.

Beta Mic has a stellar classification of A1 IV, indicating that it is an evolved A-type subgiant. Older sources give it a class of A2 Vn, suggesting that it is an A-type main-sequence star with nebulous absorption lines due to rapid rotation. Beta Mic has a solar metallicity and is estimated to be around 340 million years old.

References

Microscopium
Microscopii, Beta
Durchmusterung objects
198529
102989
7979
A-type subgiants
Microscopii, 32